Reunion Wilderness is the debut album by English band the Railway Children, released in 1987 by record label Factory. It topped the UK Independent Albums Chart.

Reception 

Trouser Press wrote: "Gary Newby's attractive voice is the band's only notable asset; otherwise this exercise in ringing electric guitars and briskly strummed acoustics is entirely routine."

Track listing

References

External links 
 

1987 debut albums
The Railway Children (band) albums
Factory Records albums